was a Japanese football player. He played for Japan national team.

Club career
Omura was born in Shizuoka Prefecture on January 1, 1933. After graduating from Rikkyo University, he played for Tanabe Pharmaceutical.

National team career
In June 1956, he was selected Japan national team for 1956 Summer Olympics qualification. At this qualification, on June 3, he debuted against South Korea. In November, he played at 1956 Summer Olympics in Melbourne. He also played at 1958 Asian Games. He played 5 games for Japan until 1958.

National team statistics

References

External links
 
 Japan National Football Team Database

1933 births
Year of death missing
Rikkyo University alumni
Association football people from Shizuoka Prefecture
Japanese footballers
Japan international footballers
Tanabe Mitsubishi Pharma SC players
Olympic footballers of Japan
Footballers at the 1956 Summer Olympics
Footballers at the 1958 Asian Games
Association football midfielders
Asian Games competitors for Japan